Gallium(III) fluoride (GaF3) is a chemical compound.  It is a white solid that melts under pressure above 1000 °C but sublimes around 950 °C. It has the FeF3 structure where the gallium atoms are 6-coordinate.  GaF3 can be prepared by reacting F2 or  HF with Ga2O3 or by thermal decomposition of (NH4)3GaF6.  GaF3 is virtually insoluble in water.  Solutions of GaF3 in HF can be evaporated to form the trihydrate, GaF3·3H2O, which on heating gives a hydrated form of GaF2(OH).  Gallium(III) fluoride reacts with mineral acids to form hydrofluoric acid.

References

Further reading

Fluorides
Gallium compounds
Metal halides